Limeum is a genus of flowering plants. It includes 25 species.

Limeum has traditionally been recognized as belonging to the Molluginaceae family, but is now treated as the sole genus in the family Limeaceae. The family is newly recognized through research by the Angiosperm Phylogeny Group III system to deal with long-standing phylogenetic difficulties in placing various genera within the Caryophyllales.  Limeum comprises subshrub and herbaceous species native to tropical, eastern and southern Africa, and South Asia. Previously, the genus Macarthuria from Australia was placed here, but it now is found to belong to Macarthuriaceae.

Species list 
Limeum contains the following species:

References

Caryophyllales genera
Caryophyllales